Above the Law is an Australian crime/drama television series broadcast on Network Ten from February 2000 to August 2001.

The drama showed the life for the residents of an apartment complex which features a police station on the ground floor.

Thirty 1-hour episodes were shown, and five episodes remain unaired.

Cast 
 Nicholas Bishop as "Matt Bridges"
 Scott Burgess as "Bill Peterson"
 Kristy Wright as "Belinda Clark"
 Meme Thorne as "Sunny Rodriguez"
 Bridie Carter as "Senior Constable Debbie Curtis"
 Alyssa-Jane Cook as "Olivia Murray"
 Teo Gebert as "Skeez"
 Jolyon James as "Constable Stavros"
 Dasi Ruz as Vicki Giovanelli

Episodes

Production details 
 Creators – Tony Morphett and Inga Hunter
 Script Editor – Christine Milligan
 Producers – Hal McElroy and Rocky Bester
 Executive Producers – Hal McElroy and Di McElroy

See also 
List of Australian television series

External links 
 
 Above The Law at Memorable TV
 Above The Law at the National Film and Sound Archive

Network 10 original programming
2000s Australian drama television series
2000 Australian television series debuts
2001 Australian television series endings